Platytes argyrotricha is a moth in the family Crambidae. It was described by George Hampson in 1908. It is found in Assam, India.

References

Crambini
Moths described in 1908
Moths of Asia